The 5000 and 10000 meters distances for men in the 2015–16 ISU Speed Skating World Cup will be contested as one cup over six races on six occasions, out of a total of World Cup occasions for the season, with the first occasion taking place in Calgary, Alberta, Canada, on 13–15 November 2015, and the final occasion taking place in Heerenveen, Netherlands, on 11–13 March 2016.

The defending champion is Jorrit Bergsma of the Netherlands.

Top three

Race medallists

Standings

References 

 
Men 5000